Kent Vaccaro (born January 1, 2002) is an American racing driver. He currently competes in the U.S. F2000 National Championship with Miller Vinatieri Motorsports.

Racing Record

Career Summary 

*Season still in progress.

References 

2002 births
Living people
Racing drivers from New York (state)
U.S. F2000 National Championship drivers

Formula Regional Americas Championship drivers
United States F4 Championship drivers